Phyllosticta theicola is a fungal plant pathogen infecting tea.

References

External links
 USDA ARS Fungal Database

Fungal plant pathogens and diseases
Tea diseases
theicola
Fungi described in 1926